This is a list of chapters for the manga series M×0. It was serialized in Weekly Shōnen Jump magazine from May 8, 2006 and May 19, 2008. Shueisha compiled the 99 individual chapters into ten tankōbon volumes.

The manga has been published in France by Tonkam, in Italy by RW Edizioni, and in Argentina by Ivrea.



Volume list

References

Lists of manga volumes and chapters